The Burning Girls is an upcoming British television series based on the novel of the same name by C.J. Tudor, adapted by Hans Rosenfeldt and Camilla Ahlgren. Developed by Buccaneer Media for Paramount+, it stars Samantha Morton and Ruby Stokes.

Synopsis
A Reverend and her daughter arrive in the village of Chapel Croft looking for a new start following a sudden loss. However, the sleepy village may have secrets of its own.

Cast
 Samantha Morton as Reverend Jack Brooks
 Ruby Stokes as Flo Brooks 
 Conrad Khan
 Rupert Graves
 Grace Orkin
 Janie Dee
 David Dawson
 Paul Bradley
 Jane Lapotaire
 Jack Roth
 Mollie Holder
 Safia Oakley-Green
 Beth Cordingly
 John Macmillan

Production
In March 2021 it was revealed that Hans Rosenfeldt would adapt the C.J. Tudor novel The Burning Girls for Buccaneer Media. Rosenfeldt had previously worked with the company developing the television series Marcella. Rosenfeldt later revealed he was working on the adaptation with Camilla Ahlgren, with whom he had previously collaborated with on popular noir series The Bridge. The series was one of the first Paramount+ UK commissions, authorised by Sebastian Cardwell, deputy chief content officer for the UK at Paramount, in April 2022 ahead of the launch of its streaming service in the United Kingdom in the summer of 2022.

Casting
In September 2022 Samantha Morton and Ruby Stokes were announced in the cast. Announced to be joining them that month were Conrad Khan, Rupert Graves, Elodie Grace Orkin, Janie Dee, David Dawson, Paul Bradley, Jane Lapotaire, Jack Roth, Mollie Holder, Safia Oakley-Green, Beth Cordingly, and John Macmillian. The book's author C.J. Tudor posted on social media that they “could not be more thrilled that these fantastic actors are bringing my book to life”.

Filming
Principal photography on the series was reported to have started in September 2022. In November 2022 location filming was reported by local media in the Buckinghamshire village of Stokenchurch Lewis, with filming at the Stokenchurch Community Centre and on The Common.

Broadcast
The producers at Buccaneer Media have revealed that the show is in post-production and they expect it to be available in stream in 2023.

References

External links

Upcoming television series
English-language television shows
Television shows filmed in England
Television shows based on novels
Paramount+ original programming